The 1967 Dallas Cowboys season was their eighth in the league. The team posted a 9–5 record and won the new four-team Capitol Division. The Cowboys hosted the Century Division winner Cleveland Browns at the Cotton Bowl and won 52–14 for the Eastern Conference title. This gained a rematch the following week for the NFL title with the two-time defending champion Green Bay Packers. Played in frigid sub-zero and windy conditions at Lambeau Field in Green Bay on December 31, the Packers scored a late touchdown to win by four points for their third consecutive NFL title. Green Bay easily won Super Bowl II two weeks later over the Oakland Raiders.

NFL Draft

Schedule

Division opponents are in bold text

Game summaries

Week 14

Standings

Roster

Postseason

References

Dallas Cowboys seasons
Dallas Cowboys
Dallas Cowboys